The 1986 California Bowl was a college football postseason bowl game that featured the Miami Redskins and the San Jose State Spartans.

Background
Miami was champion of the Mid-American Conference for the first time since 1977. San Jose State was champion of the Pacific Coast Athletic Association for the 5th time in 9 years.

Game summary
Quarterback Mike Perez went 21-of-37 for 291 yards for 3 touchdowns in an MVP effort.

 San Jose State – Olivarez 45 yard field goal
 Miami (Ohio) – Stofa 20 yard touchdown pass from Terry Morris (Gussman kick)
 San Jose State – Saxon 1 yard touchdown run (Olivarez kick)
 San Jose State – Liggins 36 yard touchdown pass from Perez (Olivarez kick)
 San Jose State – Malauulu 4 yard touchdown pass from Perez (Olivarez kick)
 San Jose State – Liggins 31 yard touchdown pass from Perez (Olivarez kick)
 San Jose State – Alexander 39 yard touchdown interception return (kick failed)

Aftermath
Miami would not play in a bowl game again until 2003 while San Jose State went to two more bowl games in the next three years (1987 and 1990) before going on a 16-year bowl drought.

Statistics

References

California Bowl
California Bowl
Miami RedHawks football bowl games
San Jose State Spartans football bowl games
Bowl